Eric Bramley Elstob  (2 August 1885 – 15 May 1949) was an English first-class cricketer and Royal Navy officer.

The son of John George Elstob and Frances Alice Elstob, he was born at Brentford in August 1885. He was educated at Marlborough College. Elstob's career with the Royal Navy began as a clerk at The Admiralty, with him promoted to assistant paymaster in August 1906. He made his debut in first-class cricket for the Royal Navy against the British Army cricket team at Lord's in 1913. He served with the navy during the First World War and was promoted to the rank of paymaster commander in August 1918. He was made an OBE in the 1919 Birthday Honours for services rendered while serving as secretary to Rear-Admiral Cecil Dampier.

Elstob later made a second and final first-class appearance for the Royal Navy against the British Army at Lord's in 1923. He returned to Marlborough College in 1933, alongside two other Old Marlburians who had served on the recently scrapped , where he presented the ship's bell to the college. He held the rank of paymaster commander by 1935, with promotion to the rank of paymaster captain coming in July of the same year. Elstob served in the first year of the Second World War, before being placed on the retired list in August 1940. He died at Hawkhurst in May 1949. His brother Wilfrith was posthumously the Victoria Cross during the First World War.

References

External links

1885 births
1949 deaths
People from Brentford
People educated at Marlborough College
Royal Navy officers
English cricketers
Royal Navy cricketers
Royal Navy personnel of World War I
Officers of the Order of the British Empire
Royal Navy logistics officers